Lawbreakers, aka Lee Marvin Presents Lawbreaker, is a 30-minute American docudrama crime anthology series.  It was produced by Rapier Productions Incorporated in association with United Artists Television for first-run syndication. Hosted and narrated by Lee Marvin, its stories were dramatizations and re-enactments of actual criminal cases. Thirty-two episodes were aired between 1963 and 1964.

References

External links

Lee Marvin Presents Lawbreaker at CVTA

1960s American anthology television series
1963 American television series debuts
1964 American television series endings
Television series by United Artists Television
First-run syndicated television programs in the United States